Hamburg attack may refer to:

Hamburg, Germany
 Hamburg Uprising, 1923, the local Communist Party attempted to start a revolution 
 Bombing of Hamburg in World War II, by the Allies
 2016 Hamburg stabbing attack, an unsolved attack on a teenage couple
 2017 Hamburg knife attack, a Palestinian killed one and injured others in a supermarket, hoping to become a martyr
 2018 Hamburg stabbing attack, a man killed his wife and daughter at a railway station following a custody dispute
 2023 Hamburg shooting, a mass shooting at a Jehovah's Witness Kingdom Hall

Elsewhere
 Hamburg Massacre, North Carolina, United States, 1876, white supremacist "Red Shirts" attacked blacks